Padar (also, Podar) is a village and municipality in the Davachi Rayon of Azerbaijan.  It has a population of 563.  The municipality consists of the villages of Padar and Borbor.

References 

Populated places in Shabran District